Josef Steger (19 March 1904 – 19 December 1964) was a German cyclist. He competed in the team pursuit event at the 1928 Summer Olympics.

References

External links
 

1904 births
1964 deaths
German male cyclists
Olympic cyclists of Germany
Cyclists at the 1928 Summer Olympics
Cyclists from Cologne
20th-century German people